1540 Kevola, provisional designation , is a dark background asteroid from the outer regions of the asteroid belt, approximately 42 kilometers in diameter. It was discovered on 16 November 1938, by astronomer Liisi Oterma at the Iso-Heikkilä Observatory in Turku, Finland. The asteroid was named after the Finnish Kevola Observatory.

Orbit and classification 

Kevola is a non-family asteroid of the main belt's background population. It orbits the Sun in the outer asteroid belt at a distance of 2.6–3.1 AU once every 4 years and 10 months (1,758 days). Its orbit has an eccentricity of 0.09 and an inclination of 12° with respect to the ecliptic.

Naming 

This minor planet was named for the Finnish Kevola Observatory . The official  was published by the Minor Planet Center on 20 February 1976.

Physical characteristics 

Kevola is an assumed carbonaceous C-type asteroid.

Rotation period 

In February 2007, a rotational lightcurve of Kevola was obtained from photometric observations by French amateur astronomer Pierre Antonini. Lightcurve analysis gave a rotation period of 20.082 hours with a brightness variation of 0.23 magnitude. Another lightcurve obtained by astronomers at the Palomar Transient Factory in October 2010, gave a concurring period of 20.071 hours with an amplitude of 0.33 magnitude.

Diameter and albedo 

According to the surveys carried out by the Infrared Astronomical Satellite IRAS, the Japanese Akari satellite and the NEOWISE mission of NASA's Wide-field Infrared Survey Explorer, Kevola measures between 37.12 and 44.18 kilometers in diameter  and its surface has an albedo between 0.0433 and 0.06.

The Collaborative Asteroid Lightcurve Link derives an albedo of 0.0474 and a diameter of 44.22 kilometers based on an absolute magnitude of 10.7.

References

External links 
 Asteroid Lightcurve Database (LCDB), query form (info )
 Dictionary of Minor Planet Names, Google books
 Asteroids and comets rotation curves, CdR – Observatoire de Genève, Raoul Behrend
 Discovery Circumstances: Numbered Minor Planets (1)-(5000) – Minor Planet Center
 
 

001540
Discoveries by Liisi Oterma
Named minor planets
19381116